The 1990 Soviet Top League season was the 53rd since its establishment. Spartak Moscow were the defending 12-times champions, but came only fifth this season and marginally qualified for continental competitions. The league was shortened and a total of fourteen teams participated. By the start of the season both Georgian teams had withdrawn followed by another withdrawal from Žalgiris at the start of competition. The league consisted of ten teams contested in the 1989 season and the Army club promoted from the Soviet First League. The representatives of the Baltic states as well as Georgia chose not to take part in the competition.

The season began on 1 March with the game between Dnipro and Rotor and lasted until 20 October 1990. The season was won by FC Dynamo Kyiv.

Participating teams
The league was reduced to 13 after first Georgian clubs (Dinamo Tbilisi and Guria Lanchkhuti) and then Žalgiris withdrew from the Soviet Top League.

Lokomotiv Moscow and the last placed Zenit Leningrad of the 1989 Soviet Top League were relegated to the 1990 Soviet First League. Lokomotiv returned to the Soviet First League after two seasons absence, while Zenit was relegated for the first time since being promoted back in 1938 through the club's merger.

Originally two teams were promoted from the 1989 Soviet First League and included PFC CSKA Moscow and FC Guria Lanchkhuti. Just before the start of new season Georgian clubs and Žalgiris left the league.

Promoted teams
 PFC CSKA Moscow – champion (returning after two seasons)
 FC Guria Lanchkhuti – 2nd place (returning after two seasons)

Withdrawn teams
 FC Guria Lanchkhuti, joined the Georgian Top League (Umaglesi Liga)
 FC Dinamo Tbilisi, joined the Georgian Top League (Umaglesi Liga)
 FC Zalgiris Vilnius, joined the 1990 Baltic League

Locations

Stadiums

Final standings

Promotion/relegation play-off
(13th team of the Top League and 4th team of the First League)

Lokomotiv Moscow won the promotion on 3–2 aggregate

Results

Top scorers
12 goals
 Oleg Protasov (Dynamo Kyiv)
 Valeri Shmarov (Spartak Moscow)

10 goals
 Eduard Son (Dnipro)

9 goals
 Mykola Kudrytsky (Dnipro)
 Aleksandr Mostovoi (Spartak Moscow)
 Mukhsin Mukhamadiev (Pamir)
 Sergei Yuran (Dynamo Kyiv)

8 goals
 Igor Korneev (CSKA Moscow)
 Valeri Masalitin (CSKA Moscow)
 Yuri Savichev (Torpedo Moscow)

Clean sheets

11 matches
 Stanislav Cherchesov (Spartak Moscow)
 Aleksandr Podshivalov (Torpedo Moscow)

10 matches
 Valeri Sarychev (Torpedo Moscow)
 Aleksandr Uvarov (Dynamo Moscow)

9 matches
 Viktor Chanov (Dynamo Kyiv)

8 matches
 Viktor Hryshko (Chornomorets Odesa)

7 matches
 Mikhail Yeryomin (CSKA Moscow)
 Andriy Kovtun (Shakhtar Donetsk)

Medal squads
(league appearances and goals listed in brackets)

Number of teams by union republic

See also
 Soviet First League 1990
 1990 Soviet Second League
 1990 Soviet Second League B
 1990 Baltic League

References

External links
  KLISF. 1990 Soviet Top League.
 KLISF. 1990 Soviet Top League (text only)
 1990 season. FootballFacts.ru

Soviet Top League seasons
1
Soviet
Soviet
1990 in Russian football
1990 in Armenian football
1990 in Belarusian football
1990 in Tajikistani football
1990 in Ukrainian association football leagues
1990 in Lithuanian football